Mr. Celebrity is a 1941 American comedy film directed by William Beaudine.

Cast
 Robert Henry as Danny Mason (as Buzzy Henry)
 James Seay as Jim Kane
 Doris Day as Carol Carter
 William Halligan as Daniel Mason
 Laura Treadwell as Mrs. Mason
 Gavin Gordon as Travers
 Frank Hagney as Patrick J. Dugan, Private Detective
 John Berkes as Johnny Martin (as Johnny Berkes)
 John Ince as Joe Farrell
 Francis X. Bushman as Francis X. Bushman
 Clara Kimball Young as Clara Kimball Young
 Larry Grey as himself ( "Cardo the Great")
 Willie Saunders as himself

References

External links
 
 Mr. Celebrity available for free download at Internet Archive

1941 films
1941 comedy films
1940s English-language films
American comedy films
American black-and-white films
Films directed by William Beaudine
Producers Releasing Corporation films
American horse racing films
1940s American films